In Islamic law, a wakīl, in older literature vakeel, is a deputy, delegate or agent who acts on behalf of a principal. It can refer to an attorney, a diplomat or the custodian of a mosque or religious order.

Wakīl is also one of the names of God in Islam, meaning "dependable", and is used as a personal name, a short form of Abdul Wakil, meaning "servant of the dependable".

See also
 Vekil - Ottoman term

References

Arabic words and phrases in Sharia
Islamic honorifics
Sharia legal terminology
Islamic legal occupations
Agency law
Names of God in Islam